Richard Friedländer (15 February 1881 in Berlin – 18 February 1939 at Buchenwald concentration camp) was a German Jewish merchant and Holocaust victim. He was the stepfather of Magda Goebbels.

Life 
Friedländer was born to a wealthy Jewish Berlin merchant family. After attending junior and high schools, he was employed as a merchant in Brussels. In 1908 he married Auguste Behrend, who was divorced from her first husband Oskar Ritschel and was the mother of Magda. Magda was enrolled at the Ursuline Convent in Vilvoorde. Friedländer eventually adopted Magda.

Magda met Günther Quandt in 1920. She and Quandt were married on 4 January 1921, and her first child, Harald, was born on 1 November 1921. The couple divorced in 1929. In December 1931, Magda married Joseph Goebbels, the Nazi Party Gauleiter (and later leader of the Reich Ministry of Public Enlightenment and Propaganda).

On 15 June 1938, Friedlander was deported to Buchenwald concentration camp during June action Aktion Arbeitsscheu Reich. He was already injured, and the hard work and catastrophic living conditions led to his death. His death certificate listed the cause of death as "heart muscle failure".

References

Bibliography
 Das tödliche Schweigen der Magda Goebbels. In: Guido Knopp: History. Geheimnisse des 20. Jahrhunderts. C. Bertelsmann, München 2002, S. 65 
 
 
 Stefanie Schüler-Springorum: Masseneinweisungen in Konzentrationslager. Aktion „Arbeitsscheu Reich“, Novemberpogrom, Aktion „Gewitter“. In: Wolfgang Benz, Barbara Distel (Hrsg.): Der Ort des Terrors. Geschichte der nationalsozialistischen Konzentrationslager. Band 1: Die Organisation des Terrors. C.H. Beck, München 2005, S. 156–164.
 
 Wolfgang Ayaß: "Asoziale im Nationalsozialismus". Klett-Cotta, Stuttgart 1995, .

1881 births
1939 deaths
German Jews who died in the Holocaust
Jewish merchants
German people who died in Buchenwald concentration camp